The Philadelphia Greyhound Terminal is the primary intercity bus station in Philadelphia, Pennsylvania.  The station is located at 1001 Filbert Street in Center City Philadelphia near the SEPTA Regional Rail Jefferson Station and the Fashion District Philadelphia shopping mall, a few hundred feet east of the Pennsylvania Convention Center and Reading Terminal Market, a few hundred feet south of Philadelphia's Chinatown district, and within 1/2 mile of Independence Mall, the U.S. Mint, and City Hall.  

The station building, which underwent an interior remodeling in early 2007, is relatively small and nondescript, belying its importance as one of the busiest, long distance, bus-only terminals in the United States.   the terminal was the 4th busiest Greyhound bus station in the U.S.

The station contains a variety of amenities for waiting passengers.  These include a snack bar, food and beverage vending machines, televisions, video games, pay telephones, and restrooms.  Like other significant transportation facilities, it also contains full service ticket counters and seating areas.

Bus companies serving the terminal

National provider
Greyhound Lines - the primary intercity bus carrier in the United States, Greyhound provides direct, one seat ride service between the bus terminal and a number of cities and towns both within and outside of Pennsylvania.  Some of those cities and large towns include:
In Pennsylvania - Allentown, Doylestown, Easton, Harrisburg, Norristown, Pittsburgh, Scranton, Stroudsburg
Outside of Pennsylvania - Albuquerque, Atlantic City, Baltimore, Boston, Columbus, Dayton, Denver, Indianapolis, Kansas City, Las Vegas, Los Angeles, Newark, New York, Norfolk, Oklahoma City, Phoenix, Richmond, St. Louis, Washington, Wilmington

Greyhound also provides connecting service to other in-state and out-of-state destinations via transfers.

Interregional providers

Various interregional bus companies also provide direct service to and from the Philadelphia bus terminal.  The companies and some of the key locations they serve include:
Fullington Trailways - Allentown, Bloomsburg, Clearfield, Danville, DuBois, Hazleton, Harrisburg, Jim Thorpe, King of Prussia, Lewisburg, Lewistown, Lehighton, Lock Haven, Philipsburg, Quakertown, State College, Williamsport
Martz Trailways - Allentown, Quakertown, Scranton, White Haven, Wilkes-Barre
Peter Pan Bus Lines - Baltimore, New York City, Washington, D.C. (pooled service with Greyhound ended 27 September 2017)

Like Greyhound, the Trailways providers' services connect with other bus routes in the Greyhound/Trailways system to allow trips to other regional and national destinations.

Regional and local transit connections
The Philadelphia Greyhound Terminal offers connections to SEPTA Regional Rail at Jefferson Station and the Market–Frankford Line at 11th Street station. Several SEPTA bus routes (and ) stop one block away from the terminal on Market Street. In addition. several NJ Transit bus routes (and ) stop in Center City Philadelphia as close as one block from the Greyhound Bus Terminal on Market Street. NJ Transit service to Philadelphia Greyhound Terminal ended on February 28, 2022 due to the reconfiguration of the bus station. The 551 bus was changed to start at 10th and Market streets while the remaining buses were changed to start at the Walter Rand Transportation Center in Camden, New Jersey, with free transfers to buses operating into Philadelphia.

History
The current site of the Philadelphia Greyhound Terminal was originally the location of the Harrison Stores building, which burned down in 1984 while under renovation. In 1985, the building was demolished and replaced with the bus station. Prior to this, the Greyhound bus station was at the current site of the BNY Mellon Center at 1735 Market Street.

On August 2, 2022, it was announced that the Philadelphia 76ers planned to buy the site of the Philadelphia Greyhound Terminal in order to construct the 76 Place at Market East arena that is planned to open in 2031. As a result, the Greyhound terminal would have to relocate, with possible locations including the former Philadelphia Police Department headquarters at 750 Race Street and the area of 30th Street Station.

References

External links

Greyhound Lines official site
Martz Trailways official site
Peter Pan Bus Lines official site
Fullington Trailways official site

Transportation buildings and structures in Philadelphia
Bus stations in Pennsylvania
Market East, Philadelphia
Greyhound Lines